Eagles is the surname of:

 Brennan Eagles, American football player
 Chris Eagles (born 1985), English footballer
 Greg Eagles, American voice actor
 Jeanne Eagels (born Eugenia Eagles), American actress
 John Eagles (1783–1855), English artist and author
 Kim Eagles (born 1976), Canadian sport shooter
 Matt Eagles (born 1990), Australian rules footballer
 Thomas Eagles (1746–1812), English classical scholar

See also
 Eagle (name)